David Armitage Bannerman OBE, MA, SD (Cantab), Hon. LL.D. (Glasgow), FRSE, FZS (27 November 1886 – 6 April 1979) was a British ornithologist. From 1919 to 1952 he was Curator of the British Museum of Natural History (now called the Natural History Museum, London).

Biography
He was the son of David Alexander Bannerman.

He was educated at Wellington College, Berkshire, before going to university.

After graduating from Pembroke College, Cambridge in 1909, Bannerman travelled extensively in Africa, the West Indies, South America and the Atlantic Islands.

Rejected on health grounds by the military, Bannerman served as a stretcher-bearer with the Red Cross for four years in France during World War I, earning the Mons Star. He was then employed, part-time, at the Natural History Museum, until his retirement in 1951, having twice declined the directorship of the British Museum. He was chairman of the British Ornithologists' Club from 1932 to 1935, having edited their Bulletin from 1914–1915 and was Vice President of the British Ornithologists Union and the Royal Society for the Protection of Birds.

He married twice: in 1911 he married Muriel Morgan(d.1945) and much later in life, in 1952, he married Winifred Mary Jane Holland.

From 1952 to 1979 he farmed in Dumfriesshire.

He also wrote for Ibis.

Bibliography

The Birds of Tropical West Africa (illustrated by George Edward Lodge; 8 vols) 1930-1951
The Birds of West and Equatorial Africa (2 vols) 1953
Larger Birds of West Africa, Penguin (London) 1958
Birds of Cyprus (with W. Mary Bannerman), Oliver & Boyd, Edinburgh 1958
The Birds of the British Isles (illustrated by Lodge) Oliver and Boyd, Edinburgh (12 vols) 1953-1963
Vol. 1: Corvidae, Sturnidae, Oriolidae, Fringillidae, 1953
Vol. 2: Alaudidae, Certhidae, Paridae, Vireonidae etc, 1953
Vol. 3: Sylviidae, Troglodytidae, Turdidae, Cinclidae, Prunellidae, Hirundinidae, 1954
Vol. 4: Apodidae, Coraciidae, Caprimulgidae, Alcedinidae, Meropidae, Picidae, Upupidae, Cuculidae, Strigidae, 1955
Vol. 5: Birds of Prey, 1956
Vol. 6: Ciconiidae, Ardeidae, Phoenicopteridae, Anatidae (Part), 1957
Vol. 7: Anatidae (Conclusion), 1958
Vol. 8: Phalacrocoracidae, Diomedeidae, Sulidae, Podicipedidae, Fregatidae, Gaviidae, Procellariidae, Columbidae, Pteroclididae, 1959
Vol. 9: Scolopacidae (Part), 1961
Vol. 10: Scolopacidae (Conclusion), Charadriidae, Recurvirostridae, Haematopodidae, 1961
Vol. 11: Glareolidae, Otdidae, Burhinidae, Gruidae, Laridae, 1962
Vol. 12: Stercorariidae, Alcidae, Rallidae, Tetraonidae, Phasianidae, 1963
The Birds of the Atlantic Islands (with W. Mary Bannerman, illustrated by D. M. Reid-Henry) Oliver and Boyd, Edinburgh (4 vols) 1963-1968 
Vol. 1: A History of the Birds of the Canary Islands and the Salvages, 1963
Vol. 2: A History of the Birds of Madeira, the Desertas, and Porto Santo Islands, 1965
Vol. 3: A History of the Birds of the Azores, 1966
Vol. 4: A History of the Birds of the Cape Verde Islands, 1968
Handbook of the Birds of Cyprus and Migrants of the Middle East (with W. Mary Bannerman) Oliver and Boyd, Edinburgh 1971 
Birds of the Maltese Archipelago (with Joseph A. Vella-Gaffiero) Museums Department, Valletta 1976
The Birds of the Balearics (with W. Mary Bannerman, illustrated by Donald Watson) Croom Helm/Tanager Books 1983 
The Canary Islands : their history, natural history and scenery Gurney and Jackson 1922

Contributions
George Lodge - Artist Naturalist John Savory (Ed.), Croom Helm, 1986 
The chapter Lodge the Man, a Biography

Notable articles
 Exhibition and description of a new subspecies of oystercatcher (Haematopus niger meade-waldoi) from the Canary Islands. Bull. B. O. C. 31: 33–34. (1913)
 A probable sight record of a Canarian black oystercatcher. Ibis 111': 257. (1969)

References

Alumni of Pembroke College, Cambridge
British ornithologists
British ornithological writers
Employees of the Natural History Museum, London
Fellows of the Royal Geographical Society
Fellows of the Zoological Society of London
1886 births
1979 deaths
Fellows of the Royal Society of Edinburgh
Officers of the Order of the British Empire
Red Cross personnel
Royal Society for the Protection of Birds people
20th-century British zoologists